Khara is a village located within the Kasur in the Punjab region of Pakistan. It is part of Kasur Tehsil and is located at 31°9'41N 74°25'28E with an altitude of 195 metres (643 feet).

References

Kasur District